Regilson Saboya Monteiro Jr. known as Juninho Cearense (born 17 December 1980) is a Brazilian footballer.

He is known for his journeyman career. He had played for clubs from 10 difference states of Brazil, or 10 of 16 states of North East, South East and Central–West region.

Biography
Born in Fortaleza, Ceará as Regilson Saboya Monteiro Jr., he chose Juninho as his artist name, a diminutive form of Júnior. While he is from Ceará state of Brazil, to distinguish with other Juninho, he is also known as Juninho Cearense.

Turkey
In January 2003 he was signed by Turkish club Samsunspor of Samsun city in -year contract (along with fellow Brazilian Milton do Ó). Juninho forced to give up the foreigner quota to Júlio César Antônio de Souza in January 2004.

Atlético Mineiro
Juninho returned to Brazil in 2004 but in July returned to hometown club Fortaleza Esporte Clube. That season played alongside another Juninho in Mineiro – Junio César Arcanjo.

Journeyman in coastal Brazil
In January 2005 he was signed by Clube de Regatas Brasil in 2-year contract, but immediately left for Marília Atlético Clube in temporary deal. In September 2005 he left for fellow Alagoas club Associação Atlética Coruripe in another temporary deal. In next season, he left for Esporte Clube Santo André. In March 2006 he returned to CRB again but in May 2006 left for Ceará Sporting Club, city rival of Fortaleza. Released in August, Juninho joined Esporte Clube Bahia in September.

Vila Nova of Goiás
In 2007, he was signed by Vila Nova Futebol Clube of Goiás state, which he extended the contract in May to last until 30 November 2007. That season he played alongside another Juninho – Júnior César Moreira da Cunha. The club promoted as the third in 2007 Campeonato Brasileiro Série C.

NE return
In January 2008 he was signed by Fortaleza again. In August 2008 he returned to CRB in short-term deal. However, in September he left for Agremiação Sportiva Arapiraquense. In January 2009 he was signed by Associação Desportiva Confiança, located in Aracaju, capital of Sergipe state. He was released in September.

Minas Gerais
In January 2010 he left for Uberlândia Esporte Clube of Minas Gerais state. However, he only played for the club in 2010 Minas Gerais Cup, finished as the runner-up. In the next season he moved to Uberaba Sport Club from nearby city, also the winner of the state cup. He played for the club in 2011 Campeonato Mineiro (round 1 to 11 except 5,7,9, 11)

Late career in NE
In April 2011 he left for Salgueiro Atlético Clube of Pernambuco state. He was released in August and replaced by another Juninho – Renato Agostinho de Oliveira Júnior.

In December 2011 Juninho signed a 1-year contract with Guarany Sporting Club, from Sobral, Ceará state. In March 2012 he left for Alagoinhas Atlético Clube for Campeonato Baiano.

In December 2012 he was signed by Alecrim Futebol Clube.

Career statistics

Note
1 6 matches and 2 goals in 2010 Taça Minas Gerais.

Honours
 Campeonato Cearense: 2008
 Campeonato Sergipano: 2009
 Campeonato Sul-Mato-Grossense: 2016

Footnotes

References

External links
 
 TFF Profile

1980 births
Living people
Sportspeople from Fortaleza
Brazilian footballers
Association football midfielders
Brazilian expatriate footballers
Brazilian expatriate sportspeople in Turkey
Expatriate footballers in Turkey
Campeonato Brasileiro Série A players
Campeonato Brasileiro Série B players
Campeonato Brasileiro Série C players
Campeonato Brasileiro Série D players
Süper Lig players
Agremiação Sportiva Arapiraquense players
Botafogo Futebol Clube (PB) players
Samsunspor footballers
Clube Atlético Mineiro players
Fortaleza Esporte Clube players
Clube de Regatas Brasil players
Marília Atlético Clube players
Associação Atlética Coruripe players
Esporte Clube Santo André players
Ceará Sporting Club players
Esporte Clube Bahia players
Vila Nova Futebol Clube players
Associação Desportiva Confiança players
Uberlândia Esporte Clube players
Uberaba Sport Club players
Salgueiro Atlético Clube players
Guarany Sporting Club players
Alagoinhas Atlético Clube players
Manaus Futebol Clube players
Caiçara Esporte Clube players
Ferroviário Atlético Clube (CE) players
Clube Desportivo Sete de Setembro players